São Leopoldo (Portuguese for Saint Leopold) is a Brazilian industrial city located in the south state of Rio Grande do Sul.

Geography
It occupies a total area of 103.9 km² (around 80 km² urban area) at circa 30 km from the State Capital, Porto Alegre. The climate is sub-tropical, with temperatures varying from -2 °C minimum at Winter to more than 40 °C maximum during summer time. Summers are fairly dry.

History
Established on July 25, 1824, by German immigrants, São Leopoldo is considered the cradle of German culture in Brazil, that is to say, it is the first official city designed by the national Brazilian governor to start the German plan of immigration in the country. It had, in 2006, a population of approximately 210,000.

São Leopoldo is one of the 13 cities along the  Rota Romântica ('Romantic Route'), a touristic scenic route that runs from the State Capital towards the Serra Gaúcha.

Minority language
Riograndenser Hunsrückisch German is a regional language in South America like Pennsylvania Deitsch is in North America. They are also similar because of their origin in the Rhine region of southwest Germany. As a Brazilian variant of European Moselle Franconian, it is also spoken beyond the state of Rio Grande do Sul, where for almost two hundred years it has been historically centered and where most of its 2 to 3 millions speakers live (there are speakers in neighboring southern Brazilian states, as well as in Argentina, Paraguay and Uruguay).

There are many other municipalities with this bilingual profile throughout the state and the German language is experiencing a strong revival: In 2012 the state chamber of deputies voted unanimously in favor of recognizing the Hunsrückisch Germanic dialect of Rio Grande do Sul an official historical Intangible cultural heritage to be preserved.

Education
The area had a German school, Instituto Preteologico. The city is the headquarters of Unisinos University.

Gallery

External links

References

Municipalities in Rio Grande do Sul
German-Brazilian culture
Populated places established in 1824